Native Appropriations is a blog that critically discusses the ways that Indigenous people are depicted in mainstream, Euro-American dominated, culture.  Active since 2010, the website is created and maintained by Cherokee Nation scholar Adrienne Keene.

Subjects
Some of the most frequently discussed topics on the blog are "hipster headdresses", the Native American mascot controversy and appropriation and misrepresentations of Native American cultures in Hollywood movies.  Targets of critique include the Washington Redskins use of an ethnic slur as the name for their football team, The Lone Ranger movie remake, misrepresentations of Native American spiritual beliefs in the work of author J. K. Rowling, the wearing of a hipster headdress and statements by musician Christina Fallin, Halloween "Pocahottie" costumes, and Urban Outfitters. Though much of the blog's commentary is critical, it is not exclusively so: Nelly Furtado, for example, has been praised for her respectful engagement with Native hoop and shawl dancers.

Coverage and influence
Keene observes that Native Americans are barely represented in mainstream media, and journalists often turn to non-Native sources, rather than to Natives themselves, on the rare occasions when they do cover Native issues. However, the increasing popularity of her blog and appearance on other social media such as Twitter has made her a widely quoted expert on matters to do with appropriations, with mentions in the BBC, NPR, The Guardian, the Phoenix New Times, Al Jazeera, Time magazine and other major news outlets. The Guardian has credited her with leading a successful campaign against stereotypical imagery created by Paul Frank Industries: the company later invited Keene and other experts to help design new product lines working with native artists.

References

External links
Native Appropriations - Representations Matter - official website

Cherokee culture
Cultural appropriation
Internet properties established in 2010
Media coverage and representation
Mass media issues
American blogs
Native American mass media
Native Americans in popular culture